Tyrone Maria (born 24 September 1984) is a footballer from Curaçao who plays as a striker in actually for SV La Fama in the Aruba first division .

He earned two caps for the Netherlands Antilles national team in 2006.

References

1984 births
Living people
Curaçao footballers
People from Willemstad
Dutch Antillean footballers
Netherlands Antilles international footballers
Curaçao international footballers
SV Bubali players
SV La Fama players
Sekshon Pagá players
Dual internationalists (football)
Association football forwards
SV Hubentut Fortuna players